Midnight Ramble is a soul-jazz album by saxophonist Hank Crawford. Released in 1982, it was his first recording for Milestone Records.

Track listing 

 "Midnight Ramble"
 "Forever Mine"
 "Theme for Basie"
 "Sister C"
 "Street of Dreams"
 "Next Time You See Me" 
 "Deep River"

Personnel 

 Hank Crawford - alto saxophone, electric piano
 David “Fathead” Newman - tenor saxophone
 Howard Johnson - baritone saxophone
 Waymon Reed - trumpet
 Charlie Miller - trumpet
 Dick Griffin - trombone
 Calvin Newborn - guitar
 Dr. John - piano, organ
 Charles "Flip" Greene - bass 
 Bernard Purdie - drum kit

References 

1982 albums
Hank Crawford albums